Karl G. Neumeier (January 29, 1889 – October 30, 1992) was an American lawyer and politician.

Neumeier was born in Stillwater, Washington County, Minnesota and graduated from Stillwater High School in 1907. He graduated from University of Minnesota and received his law degree from William Mitchell College of Law. He lived in Stillwater with his wife and family and practiced law in Stillwater, Minnesota. Neumeier served in the Minnesota Senate from 1935 to 1950. He then served on the University of Minnesota Board of Regents from 1953 to 1959. Neumeier died at the Greeley Health Care Center in Stillwater, Minnesota. His funeral and burial was in Stillwater, Minnesota.

References

1889 births
1992 deaths
American centenarians
Men centenarians
Minnesota lawyers
University of Minnesota alumni
William Mitchell College of Law alumni
Minnesota state senators